In molecular biology and genetics, transcription coregulators are proteins that interact with transcription factors to either activate or repress the transcription of specific genes.  Transcription coregulators that activate gene transcription are referred to as coactivators while those that repress are known as corepressors.  The mechanism of action of transcription coregulators is to modify chromatin structure and thereby make the associated DNA more or less accessible to transcription. In humans several dozen to several hundred coregulators are known, depending on the level of confidence with which the characterisation of a protein as a coregulator can be made. One class of transcription coregulators modifies chromatin structure through covalent modification of histones.  A second ATP dependent class modifies the conformation of chromatin.

Histone acetyltransferases 
Nuclear DNA is normally tightly wrapped around histones rendering the DNA inaccessible to the general transcription machinery and hence this tight association prevents transcription of DNA.  At physiological pH, the phosphate component of the DNA backbone is deprotonated which gives DNA a net negative charge.  Histones are rich in lysine residues which at physiological pH are protonated and therefore positively charged.  The electrostatic attraction between these opposite charges is largely responsible for the tight binding of DNA to histones.

Many coactivator proteins have intrinsic histone acetyltransferase (HAT) catalytic activity or recruit other proteins with this activity to promoters.  These HAT proteins are able to acetylate the amine group in the sidechain of histone lysine residues which makes lysine much less basic, not protonated at physiological pH, and therefore neutralizes the positive charges in the histone proteins. This charge neutralization weakens the binding of DNA to histones causing the DNA to unwind from the histone proteins and thereby significantly increases the rate of transcription of this DNA.

Many corepressors can recruit histone deacetylase (HDAC) enzymes to promoters.  These enzymes catalyze the hydrolysis of acetylated lysine residues restoring the positive charge to histone proteins and hence the tie between histone and DNA.  PELP-1 can act as a transcriptional corepressor for transcription factors in the nuclear receptor family such as glucocorticoid receptors.

Nuclear receptor coactivators
Nuclear receptors bind to coactivators in a ligand-dependent manner.  A common feature of nuclear receptor coactivators is that they contain one or more LXXLL binding motifs (a contiguous sequence of 5 amino acids where L = leucine and X = any amino acid) referred to as NR (nuclear receptor) boxes.  The LXXLL binding motifs have been shown by X-ray crystallography to bind to a groove on the surface of ligand binding domain of nuclear receptors.  Examples include:
 ARA (androgen receptor associated protein)
 ARA54
 ARA55
 ARA70
 AIRE
 BCAS3 (breast carcinoma amplified sequence 3)
 CREB-binding protein
 CRTC (CREB regulated transcription coactivator)
 CRTC1
 CRTC2
 CRTC3
 CARM1 (coactivator-associated arginine methyltransferase 1) 
 Nuclear receptor coactivator (NCOA)
 NCOA1/SRC-1 (steroid receptor coactivator-1)/ 
 NCOA2/GRIP1 (glucocorticoid receptor interacting protein 1)/ TIF2 (transcriptional intermediary factor 2)  
 NCOA3/AIB1 (amplified in breast)  
 NCOA4/ARA70 (androgen receptor associated protein 70)  
 NCOA5 
 NCOA6
 NCOA7
 p300 
 PCAF (p300/CBP associating factor) 
 PGC1 (proliferator activated receptor gamma coactivator 1)
 PPARGC1A
 PPARGC1B
 PNRC (proline-rich nuclear receptor coactivator 1)
 PNRC1
 PNRC2

Nuclear receptor corepressors
Corepressor proteins also bind to the surface of the ligand binding domain of nuclear receptors, but through a LXXXIXXX(I/L) motif of amino acids (where L = leucine, I = isoleucine and X = any amino acid).  In addition, compressors bind preferentially to the apo (ligand free) form of the nuclear receptor (or possibly antagonist bound receptor).

 CtBP 602618  (associates with class II histone deacetylases)
 LCoR (ligand-dependent corepressor)
 Nuclear receptor CO-Repressor (NCOR)
 NCOR1
 NCOR2/SMRT (Silencing Mediator (co-repressor) for Retinoid and Thyroid-hormone receptors) (associates with histone deacetylase-3)
 Rb (retinoblastoma protein)  (associates with histone deacetylase-1 and -2)
 RCOR (REST corepressor)
 RCOR1
 RCOR2
 RCOR3
 Sin3
 SIN3A
 SIN3B
 TIF1 (transcriptional intermediary factor 1)
 TRIM24 Tripartite motif-containing 24
 TRIM28 Tripartite motif-containing 28
 TRIM33 Tripartite motif-containing 33

Dual function activator/repressors
 NSD1
 PELP-1 (proline, glutamic acid and leucine rich protein 1)  
 RIP140 (receptor-interacting protein 140) 
 YAP
 WWTR1 (TAZ)

ATP-dependent remodeling factors 
 SWI/SNF family
 chromatin structure remodeling complex
 ISWI protein ,

See also
 Coactivator (genetics)
 Corepressor (genetics)
 Nuclear receptor coregulators
 RNA polymerase control by chromatin structure
 Transcription
 Transcription factor
 TcoF-DB

References

External links
 

Gene expression
Transcription coregulators